The 3rd Manchurian Army was a field army of the Russian Empire that was established in 1904 during  the Russo-Japanese War, to operate in Manchuria against Japan. It was one of the three such armies that were created and was disbanded in February 1906.

History
After the lost Battle of Liaoyang, Tsar Nicholas II of Russia decided to disband the "Manchurian Army" , that encompassed all units of the Russian Imperial Army formations operating in the region against the Imperial Japanese Army under just one commander, and split it up in the 1st, 2nd, and 3rd Manchurian Armies.

The 3rd Manchurian Army was created in December 1904 under command of General Alexander von Kaulbars. It counted 72 Battalions, 19 Squadrons, 266 guns and a total of 56,773 men. On February 12, 1905, General Alexander Bilderling took over command of the Army, followed by Mikhail Batyanov in May 1905. It participated in the Battle of Sandepu and Battle of Mukden.

After the end of the War, the 3rd Manchurian Army was disbanded in February 1906.

Order of battle
The 3rd Manchurian Army consisted of the following units :
5th Siberian Army Corps
54th Infantry Division
71st Infantry Division
6th Siberian Army Corps
55th Infantry Division
72nd Infantry Division
16th Army Corps
25th Infantry Division
41st Infantry Division
17th Army Corps
3rd Infantry Division
35th Infantry Division

Commanders
The formation was commanded by :
 12.1904-12.02.1905 : General Alexander von Kaulbars
 12.02.1905-05.1905 : General Alexander Bilderling.
 05.1905-02.1906 : General Mikhail Batyanov

References

Books

1904 establishments in the Russian Empire
Armies of the Russian Empire
Military units and formations established in 1904
Military units and formations disestablished in 1906